Interferon-induced GTP-binding protein Mx2 is a protein that in humans is encoded by the MX2 gene.

The protein encoded by this gene has a nuclear and a cytoplasmic form and is a member of both the dynamin family and the family of large GTPases. The nuclear form is localized in a granular pattern in the heterochromatin region beneath the nuclear envelope. A nuclear localization signal (NLS) is present at the amino terminal end of the nuclear form but is lacking in the cytoplasmic form due to use of an alternate translation start codon.

Antiviral activity 

This protein is upregulated by interferon-alpha but does not contain the antiviral activity of a similar myxovirus resistance protein 1. 

MX2/MXB has antiviral activity against HIV-1.  MXB is also a restriction factor for herpesviruses, which acts at a very early stage of the replication cycle and MX2/MXB restriction of herpesvirus requires GTPase activity.

References

Further reading